Point of No Return (also known as The Assassin) is a 1993 American action film directed by John Badham and starring Bridget Fonda and Gabriel Byrne. It is a remake of Luc Besson's 1990 film La Femme Nikita.

Plot
In Washington, D.C., Maggie Hayward is a drug addict convicted of murdering a police officer during a robbery shootout, and is about to be executed by lethal injection. Her demise is faked and a spy, "Bob", informs her she has to work for him. She reluctantly agrees to cooperate and begins a regimen of intensive training that includes not only martial arts and firearms training, but etiquette and computer use.

Senior Operative Amanda transforms her into a more refined, elegant woman. She is taken on a dinner date with Bob, who informs her about the first job: an assassination of a VIP eating at the same restaurant. Maggie kills the VIP and his bodyguard and then is pursued by a team of the VIP's bodyguards. She shoots several of the bodyguards and escapes from the kitchen by jumping down a laundry chute. This task was her final test and she has now completed her training.

The following morning, she heads to Venice, California, where she enters into a romantic relationship with apartment house manager J.P. While her first assignments, both hit jobs, are ultimately successful, Maggie quickly comes to hate her work and tries to quit her job as a professional killer. As matters progress between her and J.P. and her double life threatens their relationship, she asks for help in leaving the agency. Her request is denied, but Bob agrees to get her out of the agency if she completes the next task, to masquerade as Angela, the girlfriend of Fahd Bakhtiar, an Iranian business magnate trading in nuclear weapons. As she prepares for the job, J.P. continues to complain about her mysterious friends and mocks the improvised backstory that Bob had provided for himself and Maggie.

Taking out Angela proves problematic and results in the deaths of Angela's two bodyguards and the injury of Maggie’s partner, Beth. Director Kaufman then sends in Victor, a "cleaner", to get rid of the bodies and salvage the mission. Unaware to Maggie, he has also been ordered to kill both agents as well because one failure results in death. After killing the wounded Beth in front of Maggie, he drives her to Fahd's home. At gunpoint, she gets Fahd to unlock his computer and reveal his secrets, but he escapes assassination and she is forced to flee.

As they purportedly drive back to her residence, Maggie sees a gun in Victor's waistband and correctly suspects he is going to kill her. This leads to a struggle and the car spins out of control. Ultimately, Victor is dragged over a ravine and killed. Maggie makes her way back to her apartment, but leaves sometime during the night. Bob subsequently learns of her disappearance from J.P. As Bob is leaving, he sees Maggie watching him through the mist. Instead of reporting her, he calls Kaufman informing him the cleaner is dead, and after some hesitation, tells him that Maggie is also dead.

Cast

Production
Gaumont, who handled the sales of distribution rights for La Femme Nikita, sold the remake rights to Warner Bros. In 1991, it was reported Luc Besson had been commissioned to write the English-language remake. Although Besson and a team of American writers completed a first draft of the script, Besson and Warner Bros. did not agree on a directing deal, stalling development until John Badham joined the project later that year. Prior to the casting of Fonda, a number of actresses who campaigned for the role including  Winona Ryder, Madonna, Demi Moore, Juliette Lewis, and Robin Wright. Julia Roberts supposedly turned down two offers to star in the lead. Bridget Fonda was hesitant to accept the lead role not sold on doing a remake of such a recent film, but was eventually convinced to do the film after being convinced by John Badham and her Single White Female director Barbet Schroeder. Filming began in March 1992 in Los Angeles, New Orleans, and Washington, D.C. The movie was known under the working title La Femme Nikita during development, but was also considered for the title The Specialist before settling on Point of No Return.

Reception
The film received mixed reviews. Film critic Roger Ebert, who gave the original La Femme Nikita three and a half stars out of four, gave Return three stars, saying: "Point of No Return is actually a fairly effective and faithful adaptation and Bridget Fonda manages the wild identity swings of her role with intensity and conviction, although not the same almost poetic sadness that Anne Parillaud brought to the original movie. If I didn't feel the same degree of involvement with Point of No Return that I did with Nikita it may be because the two movies are so similar in plot, look, and feel. I had déjà vu all through the movie. There are a few changes, mostly not for the better. By making the heroine's boyfriend a photographer this time instead of a checkout clerk, the movie loses the poignancy of their relationship; Nikita liked her clerk precisely because he was completely lacking in aggression." The film holds an approval rating of 52% at Rotten Tomatoes gave, based on 25 reviews.

Box office
The film debuted at number 2 at the U.S. box office, behind Teenage Mutant Ninja Turtles III, with a gross of $7.2 million for the weekend from 1,545 screens. It grossed $30 million in the United States and Canada and $19.9 million internationally, for a worldwide total of $49.9 million.

Soundtrack
Maggie/Claudia has a fascination with the singer/pianist/songwriter Nina Simone. Throughout the film, various songs of Simone's are used.
 "Here Comes the Sun"
 "I Want a Little Sugar in My Bowl"
 "Feeling Good"
 "Wild Is the Wind"
 "Black Is the Color (Of My True Love's Hair)"

Together with the earlier re-release of "My Baby Just Cares for Me" in 1982, the film helped bring Nina Simone back into the public limelight and made her better known with a younger audience.

The film score was composed by Hans Zimmer.

See also
 List of assassinations in fiction

References

External links
 
 
 
 
 

1993 films
1993 action thriller films
1990s romance films
American action thriller films
American remakes of French films
1990s French-language films
Films about assassinations
Films about capital punishment
Films directed by John Badham
Films produced by Art Linson
Films set in Los Angeles
Films set in Washington, D.C.
Films shot in Los Angeles
Films shot in New Orleans
Films shot in Washington, D.C.
Girls with guns films
American martial arts films
Warner Bros. films
Films scored by Hans Zimmer
1993 martial arts films
1990s English-language films
1990s American films
Films with screenplays by Robert Getchell